Ernst Nyffeler was a Swiss footballer who played one season for FC Basel. He played as a forward.

In the 1925–26 season Nyffeler played four games for Basel and scored two goals. One of these games was in the Swiss Serie A and the other three were friendly games. He scored his goals in the test games, one against 1. FSV Mainz 05 on 5 April 1926 and one against Olympique Lillois three weeks later on 25 April.

References

Sources
 Rotblau: Jahrbuch Saison 2017/2018. Publisher: FC Basel Marketing AG. 
 Die ersten 125 Jahre. Publisher: Josef Zindel im Friedrich Reinhardt Verlag, Basel. 
 Verein "Basler Fussballarchiv" Homepage

FC Basel players
Swiss men's footballers
Association football forwards